The 1922–23 Trinity Blue Devils men's basketball team represented Trinity College (later renamed Duke University) during the 1922–23 men's college basketball season. The head coach was Jesse Burbage, coaching his first season with the Blue Devils. The team finished with an overall record of 15–7.

Schedule

|-

References

Duke Blue Devils men's basketball seasons
Duke
1922 in sports in North Carolina
1923 in sports in North Carolina